Laura Bay is a bay in the Australian state of South Australia on the west coast of Eyre Peninsula, about  southeast of Ceduna.

It is described as:. . . a small semicircular south facing bay, 1 km wide at the mouth, widening to 2 km inside. It is very protected from ocean waves and usually calm conditions prevail at the three shelly beaches, each fronted by a few hundred metres wide sand and tidal flats, and bordered and backed by stands of low mangroves.

The bay was reportedly named for Laura Douglas, the daughter of William Bloomfield Douglas who surveyed the bay for the Government of South Australia in 1858.

Laura Bay was used as a port facility from at least 1894 to at least 1937. In 1911, a jetty of about  length was built and was used until 1937, when it was demolished.

Since 2012, the bay has been part of the protected area of Nuyts Archipelago Marine Park.

See also
Laura (disambiguation)

References

Bays of South Australia
Eyre Peninsula
Great Australian Bight

External links
Ceduna Online